Voronikha is a rural locality (a village) in Sibirskoye Rural Settlement, Verkhovazhsky District, Vologda Oblast, Russia. The population was 29 as of 2002.

Geography 
Voronikha is located 41 km southeast of Verkhovazhye (the district's administrative centre) by road. Ostashevskaya is the nearest rural locality.

References 

Rural localities in Verkhovazhsky District